HMS Niger was a torpedo gunboat launched in 1892, converted to a minesweeper in 1909, and sunk in 1914 by the German submarine  near Deal.

Early history
The ship was ordered from Naval Construction & Armament, Barrow, and laid down on 17 September 1891. She was launched on 17 December 1892 and commissioned on 25 April 1893.

In 1902 she had a major refit at the Palmers Shipbuilding Company, where she was fitted with new and larger engines, and with Reed water tube boilers. On her completion she relieved  as tender to Vernon.

Sinking of HMS Niger
On the morning of 11 November a U-boat attack occurred off Deal. Around noon there was an explosion and black smoke rose from HMS Niger. Niger was the first ship sunk by U-boat commander Walther Forstmann. Forstmann was one of the most successful commanders of the Imperial German Navy in the First World War. She was also the first Allied ship to be sunk by German submarines based at the newly captured Belgian naval bases.

Many who were tracking the fighting from onshore saw the explosion and the smoke. Even though there were high winds and huge waves, boats went to the sinking ship and were able to take the crew off. Some of Nigers sailors were eating lunch when the torpedo hit and so were only lightly dressed. All officers, but only 77 men of Nigers crew survived the sinking, four people were injured. Lieutenant-Commander Arthur Thomas Muir, who commanded the ship remained on the bridge until the rest of the crew had left. He suffered serious injuries in the explosion. The injured were taken to the nearby Royal Naval Hospital.

When HMS Niger was attacked there were about 100 other ships nearby. One of these had a Dutch flag and was moored very close to Niger and then suspiciously disappeared after the attack. The British Admiralty suspected it to be a German spy ship.

The commander of the naval squadron, that HMS Niger was a member of, was Geoffrey Spicer-Simson who would later become famous for commanding a small flotilla which defeated a superior German force during the Battle for Lake Tanganyika. At the time of the sinking of Niger, Spicer-Simson was visiting his wife and some of her lady friends at a nearby hotel.

Notes and references

Notes

References

  - Total pages: 256
  - Total pages: 320
 
 
 
 
 
  
 

1892 ships
Alarm-class torpedo gunboats
Ships built in Chatham
Maritime incidents in November 1914
Ships sunk by German submarines in World War I
Victorian-era gunboats of the United Kingdom
World War I minesweepers of the United Kingdom
World War I shipwrecks in the English Channel